WHCA may refer to:

 White House Communications Agency
 White House Correspondents' Association